The New Flemish Alliance (N-VA) is a Flemish nationalist and conservative political party in Belgium. The party was founded in 2001 by the right-leaning fraction of the centrist-nationalist People's Union (VU).

The N-VA is a regionalist and separatist movement that self-identifies with the promotion of civic nationalism. It is considered part of the Flemish Movement; the party strives for the peaceful and gradual secession of Flanders from Belgium. In recent years it has become the largest party of Flanders as well as of Belgium as a whole, and it participated in the 2014–18 Belgian Government until 9 December 2018.

The N-VA was established as a centre-right party with the main objective of working towards furthering Flemish autonomy and redefining Belgium as a confederal country through gradually obtaining more powers for both Belgian communities separately with the belief that this will pave the way for eventual Flemish independence. During its early years, the N-VA mostly followed the platform of the former People's Union by characterising itself as a big tent party combining policies from the left and right with Flemish nationalism as its central theme. Furthermore, it emphasized a pragmatic and non-revolutionary image (as opposed to the far-right character of the other main Flemish pro-separatist party Vlaams Belang) in order to legitimise increased Flemish autonomy and nationalism. The party also espoused non-interventionalist and pro-individual freedom messages in its original platform.

In subsequent years, the N-VA moved to the right and has adopted a distinctly conservative identity under the leadership of Bart De Wever, who succeeded the founding leader Geert Bourgeois. The party is also known for its insistence on the exclusive use of Dutch, Flanders' sole official language, in dealings with government agencies, and for the promotion of the use of Dutch in Flanders. The N-VA advocates free-market economics and immediate tax reductions to stimulate the economy. It also supports stricter law and order and controlled immigration policies, with stronger measures to integrate immigrants in Flanders. The party previously advocated deepening ties with the European Union which the N-VA regarded as an important means to give Flanders more international influence, but have since shifted to a "Eurorealist" or "Eurocritical" stance by calling for democratic reform of the EU.

Since the 2014 European elections, the New Flemish Alliance has sat with the European Conservatives and Reformists (ECR) parliamentary group in the European Parliament.

History

Fall of the People's Union

The N-VA stems from the right-leaning faction of the People's Union (VU), a Belgian political party and broad electoral alliance of Flemish nationalists from both sides of the political spectrum. Towards the end of the 20th century, with a steadily declining electorate and the majority of the party's federalist agenda implemented, friction between several wings of the People's Union emerged. In the beginning of the 1990s, Bert Anciaux became party president and led the party in an ever more progressive direction, combining the social-liberal and social democratic ideas of his iD21-movement with the regionalist course of the People's Union. These experiments were opposed by the more traditional right-wing party base. Many of the VU's more ardent national-conservative members defected to the Vlaams Blok after becoming disgruntled with direction of the party, prompting a further decline in support. Around this time, VU member Geert Bourgeois, de facto leader of the VU's traditionalist and centre-right nationalist wing, put together the so-called "Oranjehofgroep" (which would go on to become the bedrock of the N-VA) which included fellow VU members Frieda Brepoels, Eric Defoort, Ben Weyts and Bart De Wever. The Oranjehofgroep opposed the direction in which the party was being taken by Anciaux and wanted the VU to pursue a more conservative, Flemish nationalist and separatist direction, while the wing helmed by Anciaux was looking to merge the Volksunie with its progressive programme with another political party.

Tension rose towards the end of the decade, as Geert Bourgeois was elected chairman by party members, in preference to the incumbent and progressive Patrik Vankrunkelsven who belonged to the iD21 wing. Factions subsequently clashed multiple times, over the future course of the party and possible support for current state reform negotiations. On 13 October 2001 the party openly split into three factions: the progressive wing around Bert Anciaux, which would later become the Spirit party; the conservative nationalist wing around Geert Bourgeois; and a centrist group opposing the imminent split. An internal referendum was held on the future course of the party. The right wing gained a substantial plurality of 47% and inherited the party infrastructure. Since no faction got an absolute majority, however, the name Volksunie could no longer be used under Belgian constitutional law and the VU was dissolved. The centre-right orientated faction of the VU went on to found the N-VA while the remaining centre-left faction reorganized itself as Spirit and the centrist-liberal wing mostly folded into the Open VLD.

Foundation and the election threshold
In the autumn of 2001, the New Flemish Alliance (N-VA) was officially registered. Seven members of parliament from the People's Union joined the new party. The new party council created a party manifesto and a statement of principles. The first party congress was held in May 2002, voting on a party program and permanent party structures. Geert Bourgeois was elected chairman. The N-VA initially continued some of the VU's former policies.

The party participated in elections for the first time in the 2003 federal elections, but struggled with the election threshold of 5%. This threshold was only reached in West Flanders, the constituency of Geert Bourgeois. With only one federal representative and no senator, the party lost government funding and faced irrelevance.

Cartel with CD&V
In February 2004, the N-VA entered into an electoral alliance, commonly known in Belgium as a cartel, with the Christian Democratic and Flemish (CD&V) party, the traditionally largest party, which was then in opposition. They joined forces in the regional elections in 2004 and won. Both parties joined the new Flemish government, led by CD&V leader Yves Leterme. Geert Bourgeois became a minister, and Bart De Wever became the new party leader in October 2004.

The cartel was briefly broken when the former right-wing liberal Jean-Marie Dedecker left the Open Flemish Liberals and Democrats (Open VLD) and entered the N-VA on behalf of the party executive. However, the party congress did not put Dedecker on the election list, instead preferring to continue the cartel with CD&V, who had strongly opposed placing him on a joint cartel list. Dedecker saw this as a vote of no confidence, and left the party after only 10 days, to form his own party, List Dedecker (LDD). Deputy leader Brepoels, who supported Dedecker, stepped down from the party board afterwards.

In the Belgian federal election of 2007 the CD&V/N-VA cartel won a major victory again, with a campaign focusing on good governance, state reform and the division of the electoral district Brussels-Halle-Vilvoorde. The N-VA won five seats in the Chamber of Representatives and two seats in the Senate. Yves Leterme initiated coalition talks, which repeatedly stalled (see 2007–2008 Belgian government formation). On 20 March 2008, a new federal government was finally assembled. N-VA did not join this government, but gave its support pending state reform.

The cartel ended definitively on 24 September 2008, due to lack of progression in state reform matters and a different strategy on future negotiations. N-VA left the Flemish Government and gave up its support of Leterme at the federal level.

Mainstream party
In the regional elections of June 2009, N-VA won an unexpected 13% of the votes, making them the winner of the elections, along with their old cartel partner CD&V. N-VA subsequently joined the government, led by Kris Peeters (CD&V). Bart De Wever chose to remain party leader and appointed Geert Bourgeois and Philippe Muyters as ministers in the Flemish Government and Jan Peumans as speaker of the Flemish Parliament.

In December 2018, a political crisis emerged over whether to sign the Global Compact for Migration; N-VA was against this, whereas the other three parties in the federal government supported it. On 4 December 2018, the Prime Minister of Belgium, Charles Michel, announced that the issue would be taken to parliament for a vote. On 5 December, parliament voted 106 to 36 in favor of backing the agreement. Michel stated that he would endorse the pact on behalf of parliament, not on behalf of the divided government. Consequently, N-VA quit the federal government; the other three parties continue as a minority government (Michel II).

During the 2019 federal elections the party again polled in first place in the Flemish region but saw a decline in vote share for the first time, falling to 25.6% of the Flemish vote.

Foundation and ideology
The New Flemish Alliance is a relatively young political party, founded in the autumn of 2001. Being one of the successors of the Volksunie (1954–2001), it is, however, based on an established political tradition. The N-VA works towards the same goal as its predecessor: to redefine Flemish nationalism in a contemporary setting. Party leader De Wever calls himself a conservative and a nationalist. The N-VA has previously argued for a Flemish Republic as a member state of a democratic European confederation. In its initial mission statement, the party stated that the challenges of the 21st century can best be answered by strong communities and by well-developed international co-operation, a position which reflected in their tagline: "Necessary in Flanders, useful in Europe." (.)

During the N-VA's early years a label for the political orientation for the party was difficult to find. Borrowing from its People's Union predecessor, the N-VA was initially considered a big tent or catch-all party and a socially liberal nationalist movement that combined left- and right-wing policies, and a focus on individual responsibility. The N-VA also summed up its initial platform with the slogan evolution, not revolution, arguing for a more pragmatic approach to Flemish nationalism by pursuing gradual independence for Flanders through reforms and increased autonomy for both the Flemish and Walloon regions of Belgium. This strategy assumed that through successive transfers of powers from the federal level to both regions on the one hand, and the European Union on the other, the Belgian state will gradually become obsolete. The party's early platform also supported pacifist politics and the non-aggression principle.

In its 2009 election programme, the N-VA described itself as economically liberal and ecologically green. The party supported public transport, open source software, renewable energy and taxing cars by the number of kilometres driven. It wanted more aid for developing countries and more compulsory measures to require that immigrants learn Dutch.

The party has generally been supportive of LGBT rights by backing same-sex marriage and relaxing laws for gay couples to adopt. It calls for measures to protect weaker members of society but also robust welfare reform to encourage people into work and reduce unemployment. The N-VA also supports abolishing the Belgian Senate.

In recent years, the N-VA has shifted from a big tent to an avowedly conservative party by basing some of its socio-economic policies on that of the British Conservative Party. Political scientist Glen Duerr has described the N-VA's current position as evolving to somewhere between that of Vlaams Belang and CD&V.

Since 2014, the N-VA has been described as continuing to move ideologically further to the right under the influence of Bart De Wever and Theo Francken by adopting tougher stances on immigration, integration of minorities, requirements to obtain Belgian citizenship, law and order, national security and repatriation of foreign born criminals and illegal immigrants. In 2015, German weekly Die Zeit published a list of 39 successful radical political parties in Europe. The paper described N-VA as right-wing populist and separatist because it reduces complex political problems to territorial issues. N-VA responded that "foreign media find the party difficult to place, so they just label us as extremists." In 2018, the party opposed the UN Global Compact for Migration and subsequently withdrew its participation in the Belgian government in protest of its passing. Some commentators have attributed these shifts as a response to a revival in support for the Flemish nationalist Vlaams Belang, which also campaigned against the Migration Compact. In contrast to other Belgian parties, the N-VA is more critical of the cordon sanitaire placed on Vlaams Belang and recently has been more open to negotiating with the party (although accepting former Vlaams Blok/Vlaams Belang members as defectors into the N-VA still remains controversial within some ranks of the party).

In terms of foreign policy, the N-VA's stance on the European Union began as strongly pro-European in character (which it regarded as an important means of gaining legitimacy for Flemish nationalism on an international stage) and in 2010 the party called for "an ever stronger and more united Europe." However, the party has since moved in a Eurocritical direction and takes a more critical stance on European integration by no longer endorsing a European confederation, calling for less EU interference at national decision making levels, more democratic reform of the EU and arguing that economically unstable nations should leave the Eurozone. The party is critical of the EU's stance on illegal immigration (in particular its handling of the migrant crisis) and the role played by NGOs in picking up migrants. The N-VA argues that the EU should emulate the Australian model of border protection to reinforce its external border and work with nations outside of Europe to stem the flow of illegal migrants arriving by sea.

At European level, the N-VA is part of the European Free Alliance (EFA), a European political party consisting of regionalist, pro-independence and minority interest political parties, of which the People's Union was a founder member. During the 7th European Parliament of 2009–2014, the N-VA was a member of The Greens–European Free Alliance (Greens/EFA) group in the European Parliament. However, following the 2014 European elections, the N-VA announced it was moving to a new group and chose the European Conservatives and Reformists (ECR) over the Alliance of Liberals and Democrats for Europe.

Party chairmen

Faction leaders
 Party chairman: Bart De Wever
 Chamber of Representatives: Peter De Roover
 Senate: Karl Vanlouwe
 Flemish Parliament: Wilfried Vandaele
 European Parliament: Geert Bourgeois
 Brussels Parliament: Cieltje Van Achter

Electorate
In the federal elections in 2003 N-VA received 3.1% of the votes, but won only one seat in the federal parliament. In February 2004 they formed an electoral alliance (cartel) with the Christian Democratic and Flemish party (CD&V). The cartel won the elections for the Flemish Parliament. The N-VA received a total of 6 seats. However, on 21 September 2008 the N-VA lost its faith in the federal government and the following day minister Geert Bourgeois resigned. In a press conference he confirmed the end of the CD&V/N-VA cartel.

In the 2004 European elections, N-VA had 1 MEP elected as part of the cartel with CD&V.

In the 10 June 2007 federal elections, the cartel won 30 out of 150 seats in the Chamber of Representatives and 9 out of 40 seats in the Senate.

In the regional elections of 11 June 2009, N-VA (now on its own after the split of the cartel with CD&V) won an unexpected 13% of the votes, making them the winner of the elections along with their former cartel partner. In the 2009 European elections held on the same day, the N-VA had one MEP elected.

In the 2010 federal elections, N-VA became the largest party of Flanders and of Belgium altogether.

In the 2014 federal elections, N-VA increased their dominant position, taking votes and seats from the far-right Flemish Interest. In the simultaneous 2014 regional elections and 2014 European elections, the N-VA also became the largest party in the Flemish Parliament and in the Belgian delegation to the European Parliament.

In the 2019 federal elections the party remained in first place in the Chamber of Representatives, European Parliament and Flemish Parliament, but saw a decline of their vote share for the first time, obtaining 16.03% of the votes in the Federal Parliament. With a decline of 24.7 percent of their votes compared to 2014, the N-VA suffered the biggest election defeat of any Flemish government party in the last fifty years. The decline in votes was in part due to a sudden upsurge in support for the Flemish Interest.

Electoral results

Chamber of Representatives

Senate

Regional

Brussels Parliament

Flemish Parliament

European Parliament

Representation

European politics
N-VA holds three seats in the ninth European Parliament (2019–2024) for the Dutch-speaking electoral college.

Federal politics

Regional politics

Flemish Government

Former Flemish Ministers 

 Geert Bourgeois, former Minister-President (2014-2019) and Minister (2004-2014)
 Liesbeth Homans, former Minister-President (2019) and Minister (2014-2019)
 Philippe Muyters, former Minister (2009-2019)

Flemish Parliament

Parliament of the Brussels-Capital Region

References

External links

 

Civic nationalism
European Conservatives and Reformists member parties
Flemish Movement
Flemish political parties in Belgium
Separatism in Belgium
Secessionist organizations in Europe
Political parties established in 2001
Ethnicity in politics
European Free Alliance
Pro-independence parties
2001 establishments in Belgium
Conservatism in Belgium
Conservative parties in Belgium
Right-wing parties in Europe
Liberal conservative parties
Centre-right parties in Europe
Regionalist parties
New Flemish Alliance